Aïn Séfra is a district in Naâma Province, Algeria. It was named after its capital, Aïn Séfra.

Municipalities
The district is further divided into 2 municipalities:
Aïn Séfra
Tiout

 
Districts of Naâma Province